The 2009–10 season was the first time Newcastle United Football Club had played in the Championship following relegation after 16 consecutive years in the Premier League. In the 2009–10 season, they won promotion back to the top division after finishing in first place in the 2009–10 Championship.

Following the club's relegation, the team's pre-season had been dominated by uncertainty over manager, owner and the players. By the time the season began, caretaker manager Chris Hughton was put in charge, and his position was made permanent in October. Despite a blip in October, the club spent almost all of its season in the top three in the division and some blistering home results saw Newcastle automatically promoted by Easter. They confirmed their promotion as winners of the entire division two weeks later, with the club registering 102 points.

Season summary
The club spent the majority of the pre-season searching for a new owner, and by the start of the season, no successful attempt was made to sell the club, and no players signings were made. Obafemi Martins, Sébastien Bassong, Habib Beye, David Edgar, Damien Duff, Michael Owen, Peter Løvenkrands and Mark Viduka all departed the club.

Alan Shearer announced he was unsure whether he would be continuing as manager due to lack of contact from the club.

An emotional distraction from the club's situation occurred when Sir Bobby Robson died on 31 July 2009, uniting the world of football in tributes to the manager who was fondly remembered by Newcastle United fans as well the many other clubs he managed in his time, including the national side. St James' Park proved to be the leading tribute for Sir Bobby Robson as tributes of flowers and messages were laid among the stadium. The season went underway managerless with some players futures at the club still in jeopardy, but achieving a draw with West Bromwich Albion on the opening day of the Championship, and a 3–0 victory over Reading, as Shola Ameobi scored and dedicated his hat-trick to the late Sir Bobby Robson.

Several takeover bids were revealed, yet none prevailed. United, however, continued a bright opening start to the season with six games unbeaten at the top of the table, and caretaker boss Chris Hughton collect the Manager of the Month prize for the Championship. The transfer window closed without full-time players signed, although Løvenkrands decided to rejoin on the final day of the transfer window, but Hughton was granted permission to sign players on loan, acquiring Danny Simpson from Manchester United, and Zurab Khizanishvili from Blackburn Rovers. Later in the year, he signed Marlon Harewood on loan from Aston Villa and Fabrice Pancrate on a free transfer.

Chris Hughton
After Kevin Keegan ruled out another return to Newcastle, Chris Hughton became the club's permanent manager on 27 October 2009. He expressed his honour and delight at the role and felt challenged by the aim to take united back to the Premier League. Simultaneously, Ashley once again withdrew the club from sale after again claiming he had been unsuccessful in finding a suitable buyer for the club, despite reducing his asking price to £80 million, also announcing he held deep regret over buying the club. the club confirmed he would invest more money into the club's debt and would work on re-branding the stadium name. Derek Llambias confirmed that St James' Park would not be completely renamed, but linked with a notable sponsorship deal. Fan protests, however, continued on Ashley upon the club's home win against Peterborough United, with banners and chants being demonstrated against his plans before, during and after the match.

The squad, however, continued to produce good results, and by mid-December had established a seven-point lead on top of the Championship table, producing seven wins back-to-back, the first of which the club has produced since 1996 under Keegan. The club still remained top of the league as of January 2010 and had an impressive Peter Løvenkrands hat-trick in a 3–0 win over Plymouth Argyle in the FA Cup, but following a loss to title rivals West Brom, the club were knocked out of the competition. The January transfer window saw Marlon Harewood returned to parent club Aston Villa following an injury, Hughton moving to strengthen the club's defence by signing Danny Simpson permanently, Fitz Hall from QPR defender Mike Williamson from Portsmouth, and defender Patrick van Aanholt on a month's loan from Chelsea. He also signed Queens Park Rangers winger Wayne Routledge. A bid for Crystal Palace striker Victor Moses was unsuccessful as Moses opted to move instead to Premier League team Wigan Athletic. Moreover, the club failed to sign Jermaine Beckford from Leeds United nor Sol Campbell on a free deal, who ironically announced expressed interest. The final transfer saw Coventry City striker Leon Best join the club on a -year deal.

In March 2010, Kevin Nolan was named the Championship Player of the Year in the Football League Awards.

Worries of the club's promotion ambitions began to surface following allegations of Steven Taylor and Andy Carroll being involved in a fight at the club's training ground, with both said to have been hospitalised following the incident. Carroll returned to the squad the following day to score the winner against Doncaster Rovers, and despite leaving hospital the following day also, after surgery, Taylor was confirmed to miss the rest of the season, despite being in the final stages of recovery from a knee injury, with rumours of also suffering a broken jaw.

The club, however, secured promotion back to the Premier League on 5 April 2010 following Nottingham Forest only managing a 0–0 draw with Cardiff City, leaving the club indefinitely finishing in the top two of the table. Although a win against Sheffield United that evening would have secured the promotion for the club nonetheless, the club defeated Sheffield 2–1 and manager Chris Hughton celebrated with a promotion party after the match with the players celebrating with the fans.

Newcastle United won the Championship League Trophy on 19 April 2010 following a 2–0 victory at Plymouth.

The club finished the final games of the season with a 2–2 draw with Ipswich Town at St James' Park and a final day, 1–0 away win at QPR. The final league table saw Newcastle breaking the 100 points barrier, winning 30 league games, drawing 12 and losing only 4.

Team kit
The team kit for the 2009–10 season is produced by Adidas and Northern Rock will remain as the main sponsor. During the season Northern Rock signed a new contract but dissatisfaction with Mike Ashley saw Adidas terminate their deal after 15 years as sponsors. Puma became Newcastle's new kit makers at the end of the season.

Chronological list of events
3 June 2009: Newcastle United and Middlesbrough were given byes into the second round of the League Cup.

11 June 2009: Singapore-based Profitable Group declared an interest in acquiring Newcastle United.

17 June 2009: The Championship 2009–2010 season fixtures were announced.

19 June 2009: Four unidentified groups progressed to the due diligence phase in the bid to take over the club. Neither Profitable Group or the consortium involving Freddy Shepherd were amongst them.

22 June 2009: Newcastle unveil new yellow striped away kit.

27 June 2009: Mark Hulse and Robbie Elliott announced that they would quit the backroom staff at the end of July.

11 July 2009: Newcastle's first Pre-Season Friendly sees them thrash Irish side Shamrock Rovers 3–0 on their home turf.
13 July 2009: Newcastle's planned pre-season match on 26 July against Utrecht was cancelled, following concerns raised by the Mayor of Amsterdam regarding both Newcastle and Sunderland visiting the Netherlands at the same time

18 July 2009: A Fine Performance sees Chris Hughton's side thrash Darlington 7–2 at the Darlington Arena
21 July 2009: The Magpies win their third friendly in a row beating Huddersfield Town 2–1.
25 July 2009: Newcastle suffer probably their most humiliating friendly defeat losing 6–1 at League 1 side Leyton Orient, some newspapers then say that they're going down again.
28 July 2009: Profitable Group stated they had no further interest in buying the club, citing "a lack of communication and response" from Mike Ashley.

29 July 2009: Newcastle's only pre-season match at St James' Park sees them held to a goalless draw by Leeds United
31 July 2009: Newcastle United mourned the passing of former manager Sir Bobby Robson, who died following a long battle with cancer.

2 August 2009: Newcastle unveiled new black and blue striped third kit.

8 August 2009: Newcastle's first match of the season sees Damien Duff earn a 1–1 draw at West Brom, who were also relegated in what proved to be the Irishman's last game for the club.
14 August 2009: Danny Simpson joins on loan from Manchester United
15 August 2009: Shola Ameobi nets his first Newcastle hat-trick in a 3–0 win over Reading.
18 August 2009: Derek Llambias stated that Barry Moat had "stepped up his interest" in regards to a possible £100 million takeover.

19 August 2009: Shola Ameobi goes to the top of the Championship goal scoring charts with the only goal of a win over Sheffield Wednesday
22 August 2009: Newcastle win 2–0 at Crystal Palace to move into second place, with Kevin Nolan and Ryan Taylor scoring their first goals for the club.
24 August 2009: Newcastle United made an official statement extending the deadline for Barry Moat to table an offer for the club.

26 August 2009: Geoff Sheard confirmed that he was fronting a bid by a mystery American company to buy the club.

26 August 2009: In a classic Carling Cup encounter at home to League 1 Huddersfield Town, the visitors equalized through Theo Robinson just a minute after Danny Guthrie opened the scoring before taking a 3–1 lead through another for Robinson from the penalty spot and a Jordan Rhodes strike. However, a Geremi goal and a Kevin Nolan strike sandwiching a Shola Ameobi penalty give Newcastle a 4–3 win, denying former Newcastle midfielder Lee Clark's team their first win on Tyneside since October 1953, just five weeks after the terriers were beaten in a friendly by the Magpies.
31 August 2009: A fantastic strike from Danny Guthrie puts Newcastle top of the Championship with a 1–0 win over Leicester City.
3 September 2009: Chief scout Lil Fuccillo joined Championship rivals Swansea City.

13 September 2009: Newcastle are the first team to win at promotion rivals Cardiff City's new Cardiff City Stadium thanks to Fabricio Coloccini's first Newcastle goal.
16 September 2009: Chris Hughton's side suffer a first league defeat of the season at Blackpool despite Andy Carroll's first goal of the season.
26 September 2009: Both teams playing in the Ipswich Town – Newcastle United match wore strips commemorating Sir Bobby Robson. The strips were to be auctioned after the match, with the proceeds going to the Sir Bobby Robson Foundation.

2 October 2009: Former manager Kevin Keegan was awarded £2 million damages by an employment tribunal for constructive dismissal.

27 October 2009: Newcastle appointed Chris Hughton as permanent manager until the end of the 2010–11 season. Also, Mike Ashley announced that he had taken the club off the market and intended to invest a further £20 million.

18 January 2010: Northern Rock signed a new four-year sponsorship deal with Newcastle United, worth between £1.5 and £10 million, starting from the 2010–11 season.

19 January 2010: Puma signed a deal to become the club's official supplier for two years starting from the beginning of the 2010–11 season.

5 April 2010: Newcastle promoted to the Premier League for the 2010–11 season after Nottingham Forest draw 0–0 with Cardiff.

19 April 2010: Newcastle won the Football League Championship after a 2–0 win over Plymouth Argyle.

24 April 2010: Newcastle lifted the Championship trophy in front of a new Championship record attendance of 52,181 fans after a 2–2 draw with Ipswich.

2 May 2010: Newcastle finished the 2009–10 season with a 1–0 victory at Queens Park Rangers. This gave the team a total of 102 League points, surpassing the 100-point mark for the first time in the club's history.

Players

First-team
Squad at end of season

Left club during season

Reserve squad
The following players did not appear for the first team this season, and made most of their appearances for the reserves, but may have also appeared for the under-18s.

Under-18 squad
The following players made most of their appearances for the under-18s, but may have also appeared for the reserves.

Statistics

Appearances, goals and cards
(Substitute appearances in brackets)

Starting formations

Captains

Coaching staff

Transfers

In

 Total spending:  ~ £2,750,000

Out

 Total income:  ~ £23,500,000

Loans in

Loans out

 *=Jonny Godsmark returned early from Hereford United due to an injury.

Competitions

Pre-season

League

FA Cup

League Cup

Matches

Pre-season

League

FA Cup

League Cup

References

External links

Newcastle United
Newcastle United F.C. seasons